Events in the year 1828 in Japan.

Incumbents 
Monarch: Ninkō

Births
January 23 - Saigō Takamori (d. 1877), samurai
 Oura Okei (d. 1884), businesswoman

References 

 
1820s in Japan
Japan
Years of the 19th century in Japan